The Instituto Português de Oncologia Francisco Gentil, also known as the Instituto Português de Oncologia (I.P.O.), Portuguese for Portuguese Oncology Institute, is a state-run cancer hospital and research organization in Portugal. The I.P.O. has autonomous regional branches in Lisbon, Porto and Coimbra.

External links
  IPO Coimbra 
  IPO Lisbon
  IPO Porto

Hospitals in Portugal
Research institutes in Portugal
Cancer organizations
Hospitals with year of establishment missing